Arc Infrastructure (previously known as Brookfield Rail and  WestNet Rail) is a transport infrastructure owner and access provider in Western Australia with a long-term lease on the network from the Government of Western Australia. It operates approximately 5,500 km of standard, narrow and dual gauge rail infrastructure in the southern half of the state.

History

In December 2000, the State Government privatised Westrail, with the Australian Railroad Group, a 50/50 joint venture between United States rail operator Genesee & Wyoming and Australian rural services company Wesfarmers, the successful bidder. Included in the sale was a 49-year lease on the below rail infrastructure network. This part of the business was rebranded as WestNet Rail.

On 1 June 2006, Australian Railroad Group was sold with the above rail rolling stock and terminal assets passing to QR National, and the below rail infrastructure business to Babcock & Brown Infrastructure. Initially Babcock & Brown held a 51% shareholding, the remaining 49% being held by minority shareholders with Babcock & Brown having an option to increase its holding.  In March 2008 Babcock & Brown increased its shareholding to 76%. It later took full ownership.

In late 2009, Babcock & Brown Infrastructure was renamed Prime Infrastructure and again by December 2010 to Brookfield Infrastructure Partners following Brookfield Asset Management's purchase of the business. In August 2011, WestNet Rail was rebranded as Brookfield Rail.

In 2017, Brookfield Rail relocated its headquarters from Welshpool to Perth Airport. In July 2017, the company was again rebranded as Arc Infrastructure.

Current operations

It is responsible for maintaining the network and granting access to operators.

See also
Wheatbelt railway lines of Western Australia

References

External links

 
Companies based in Perth, Western Australia
Railway infrastructure companies of Australia
Rail transport in Western Australia
Australian companies established in 2006
Railway companies established in 2006